Berkeley Studies (Berkeley Newsletter until December 2007) is an annual on-line academic journal established in 1977. It publishes scholarly articles on anything related to George Berkeley. The journal also gives news of the last events in Berkeley scholarship: book reviews, information about coming pertinent conferences, and abstracts from reports delivered at such conferences. Assembling bibliography on Berkeley constitutes an essential part of the editors' work.

The first issue of the journal was published and distributed by the Philosophy Department at Trinity College, Dublin. When Hampden-Sydney College hosted the journal's web site in 2005, issues started to be published in the new format of an online journal. The previous issues were digitized and are available for free download in PDF format.

While publishing papers in English, the journal welcomes review articles on the reception of Berkeley's philosophy in non-English-speaking countries.

Berkeley Studies is sponsored by Hampden-Sydney College and the International Berkeley Society, but editorial operations are independent from both.

See also 
 List of philosophy journals

References

External links 
 

Open access journals
English-language journals
Annual journals
Publications established in 1977
George Berkeley
Berkeley, George